Nkatie Cake also known as Peanut Cake is a Ghanaian snack. Nkatie cake is usually in a candy bar or shaped in any form made with groundnuts or peanuts and melted sugar. This snack is  also common in Guinea, they refer to it as  Kongodo and in Senegal it is known as louga. The snack is eaten by both the young and old, but very common among school children.

Ingredients 
The ingredients used in preparing Nkatie cake are:

 A cup of sugar.
 Fried and polished groundnut or peanut (whole or slightly crushed).
 Water.
 A roller or any smooth-sided glass bottle

Preparation 
Method of preparing Nkatie Cake.

 Pour sugar in a saucepan and heat for 5 minutes.
 When it turns brown add your whole or slightly crushed peanut or groundnut.
 Stir carefully and add a little water to prevent hardening.
 Dish out from saucepan onto a flat surface.
 Spread and flatten with the roller/bottle.
 Cut into bars or any preferred shape and serve.
NB. Spreading and cutting of the malleable mixture should be done quickly before it cool and hardens.

References

External links 
 How to prepare Nkatie Cake.

African cuisine
Ghanaian cuisine
Snack foods